Athletes from the Federal Republic of Yugoslavia competed at the 1996 Summer Olympics in Atlanta, United States.  These Games were the first Olympic appearance of Montenegrin and Serbian athletes under the Flag of the Federal Republic of Yugoslavia and the continuation of the use of Yugoslavia as a designation.  The nation was not allowed to participate at the 1992 Summer Olympics because of international sanctions.  Several Yugoslav athletes competed as Independent Olympic Participants at those Games.  New Yugoslavia participated in thirteen sports: athletics, basketball, canoe/kayak, diving, fencing, judo, shooting, swimming, table tennis, volleyball, water polo, weightlifting, and wrestling.

Medalists

Gold
 Aleksandra Ivošev – Shooting — Women's 50 metre rifle three positions

Silver
Dejan Tomašević, Miroslav Berić, Dejan Bodiroga, Željko Rebrača, Predrag Danilović, Vlade Divac, Aleksandar Đorđević, Saša Obradović, Žarko Paspalj, Zoran Savić, Nikola Lončar, Milenko Topić — Basketball, Men's Team Competition

Bronze
Aleksandra Ivošev — Shooting, Women's 10 metre air rifle
Vladimir Batez, Dejan Brđović, Đorđe Đurić, Andrija Gerić, Nikola Grbić, Vladimir Grbić, Rajko Jokanović, Slobodan Kovač, Đula Mešter, Željko Tanasković, Žarko Petrović, Goran Vujević — Volleyball, Men's Team Competition

Athletics

Men's Marathon
 Borislav Dević — 2:21.22 (→ 49th place)

Men's 50 km Walk
Aleksandar Raković — 3:51:31 (→ 11th place)

Men's High Jump
 Dragutin Topić 
 Qualification — 2.28m
 Final — 2.32m (→ 4th place)

 Stevan Zorić 
 Qualification — 2.15m (→ did not advance)

Men's Long Jump
 Andreja Marinković
 Qualification — 7.17m (→ did not advance)

Men's Shot Put
 Dragan Perić 
 Qualification — 19.61m
 Final — 20.07m (→ 8th place)

Women's 200 metres
 Marina Živković
 Heat — 23.51 (→ did not advance)

Women's 400 metres
 Marina Živković
 Heat — 53.10 (→ did not advance)

Women's Marathon
 Suzanna Ćirić — 2:49.30 (→ 55th place)

Basketball

Men's tournament

Team Roster
Dejan Tomašević
Miroslav Berić
Dejan Bodiroga
Željko Rebrača
Predrag Danilović
Vlade Divac
Aleksandar Đorđević
Saša Obradović
Žarko Paspalj
Zoran Savić
Nikola Lončar
Milenko Topić
Preliminary round

Quarterfinals

Semifinals

Gold medal match

Canoeing

 Petar Sibinkić
Qualifying Heat — 1:45.799
Repechage: 1:46.532 (→ did not advance)

Diving

Men's 3m Springboard
Siniša Žugic
 Preliminary Heat — 181.17 (→ did not advance, 38th place)

Vukan Vuletić
 Preliminary Heat — 181.17 (→ did not advance, 37th place)

Fencing

Women's épée
 Tamara Savić-Šotra
Round 1: Lost to Yuliya Garayeva of Russia (7:15) (→ did not advance)

Judo

Men's Half-Middleweight 
 Dragoljub Radulović

Men's Heavyweight
 Mitar Milinković

Shooting

Men's 10m Air Rifle 
Goran Maksimović
 Qualification: 589 points (15th overall, did not advance)

Nemanja Mirosavljev
 Qualification: 589 points (15th overall, did not advance)

Men's 50m Rifle Prone
Stevan Pletikosić
 Qualification: 595 points (11th overall, did not advance)

Goran Maksimović
 Qualification: 594 points (20th overall, did not advance)

Men's 50m Rifle 3 Positions
Goran Maksimović
 Qualification: 1173 points (Prone: 394 points, Standing: 387 points, Kneeling: 392 points) (3rd overall, Qualified)
Final: 95.8 points (Total: 1268.8) → 4th place

Stevan Pletikosić
Qualification: 1156 points (Prone: 398 points, Standing: 369 points, Kneeling: 389 points) (35th overall, did not advance)

Women's 10m Air Rifle 
Aleksandra Ivošev
 Qualification: 395 points (5th overall, Qualified)
Final: 102.2 points (Total: 497.2) →  Bronze Medal

Aranka Binder
 Qualification: 393 points (Shootoff: 4th: 100; 3rd: 98) (9th overall, did not advance)

Women's 50m Rifle 3 Positions
Aleksandra Ivošev
 Qualification: 587 points (Prone: 199 points, Standing: 193 points, Kneeling: 195 points) (2nd overall, Qualified)
Final: 99.1 points (Total: 686.1) →  Gold Medal

Aranka Binder
 Qualification: 574 points (Prone: 197 points, Standing: 189 points, Kneeling: 188 points) (22nd overall, did not advance)

Women's 10m Air Pistol 
 Jasna Šekarić
Qualification: 384 points (5th overall, Qualified)
Final: 103.1 points (Total: 487.1) →  4th

 Marija Mladenović
Qualification: 379 points (34th overall, did not advance)

Women's 25m Pistol 
 Jasna Šekarić
Qualification: 580 points (8th overall, Qualified)
Final: 100.4 points (Total: 680.4) →  6th

Swimming

Men's 100 Freestyle
 Nikola Kalabić
 Heat — 52.98 (→ did not advance, 53rd place)

Men's 100 Butterfly
 Vladan Marković
 Heat — 54.90 (→ did not advance, 28th place)

Men's 200 Butterfly
 Vladan Marković
 Heat — 2:01.80 (→ did not advance, 28th place)

Women's 50 Freestyle
 Duška Radan
 Heat — 27.62 (→ did not advance, 45th place)

Women's 100 Freestyle
 Duška Radan
 Heat — 1:00.34 (→ did not advance, 46th place)

Women's 200 Backstroke
 Maja Grozdanić
 Heat — 2:20.65 (→ did not advance, 27th place)

Table tennis

Men's Singles Competition
 Ilija Lupulesku
Preliminary Round (Group D)
Lost to Lee Chul-Seung of South Korea (1–2)
Defeated Isaac Opoku of Ghana (0–2)
Lost to Jan-Ove Waldner of Sweden (0–2)
 3rd in pool D (→ did not advance)

 Slobodan Grujić
Preliminary Round (Group F)
Defeated Philippe Saive of Belgium (2–1)
Defeated Mark Smythe of Australia (2–1)
Lost to Liu Guoliang of China (1–2)
 2nd in pool F (→ did not advance)

 Aleksandar Karakašević
Preliminary Round (Group N)
Lost to Li Gun-Sang of North Korea (1–2)
Lost to Yoo Nam-Kyu of South Korea (0–2)
Defeated  Michael Hyatt of Jamaica (2–0)
 3rd in pool N (→ did not advance)

Men's Doubles Competition
 Ilija Lupulesku and Slobodan Grujić
Preliminary Round (Group H)
Defeated Sule Olaleye and Segun Toriola of Nigeria (2–0)
Defeated Petr Korbel and Josef Plachy of Czech Republic (2–0)
Lost to Koji Matsushita and Hiroshi Shibutani of Japan (0–2)
 2nd in pool H (→ did not advance)

Volleyball

Men's Indoor Team Competition
Preliminary Round (Group B)
 Defeated Russia (3–1)
 Defeated South Korea (3–0)
 Defeated Tunisia (3–1)
 Lost to the Netherlands (0–3)
 Lost to Italy (0–3)
Quarterfinals
 Defeated Brazil (3–2)
Semifinals
 Lost to Italy (1–3)
Bronze Medal Match
 Defeated Russia (3–1) →  Bronze Medal

Team Roster
Vladimir Batez 
Dejan Brđović (captain)
Đorđe Đurić 
Andrija Gerić 
Nikola Grbić 
Vladimir Grbić
Rajko Jokanović 
Slobodan Kovač 
Đula Mešter 
Željko Tanasković 
Žarko Petrović
Goran Vujević

Water polo

Preliminary round

Group A

Saturday July 20, 1996

Sunday July 21, 1996

Monday July 22, 1996

Tuesday July 23, 1996

Wednesday July 24, 1996

Quarterfinals
Friday July 26, 1996

Semifinals
Saturday July 27, 1996 — 5th/8th place

Finals
Sunday July 28, 1996 — 7th place

Team Roster
Igor Milanović
Mirko Vičević
Aleksandar Šoštar
Viktor Jelenić
Aleksandar Šapić
Dejan Savić 
Petar Trbojević 
Veljko Uskoković
Vladimir Vujasinović
Predrag Zimonjić
Ranko Perović
Vaso Subotić
Milan Tadić

Weightlifting

Men

Wrestling

Greco-Roman 

Men's Middleweight
 Aleksandar Jovančević
Round 1: Lost to Raatbek Sanatbayev of Kyrgyzstan (0–3)
Classification Round 2: Defeated Elias Marcano of Venezuela (11–1)
Classification Round 3: Defeated Anton Arghira of Romania (5–0)
Classification Round 4: Lost to Levon Geghamyan of Armenia (0–2) → 9th place

Men's Light-Heavyweight
 Goran Kasum
Round 1: Defeated Doug Cox of Canada (3–0)
Round 2: Lost to Hakkı Başar of Turkey (0–3)
Classification Round 3: Lost to Reynaldo Peña of Cuba (0–3) → 18th place

References

External links
Official Olympic Reports
International Olympic Committee results database
Serbian Olympic Committee

Nations at the 1996 Summer Olympics
1996
1996
Olympics